Enrico De Lorenzo was an Italian bobsledder who competed during the 1960s. He won three medals at the FIBT World Championships with a gold (Two-man: 1962) and two silvers (Two-man: 1965, Four-man: 1962).

References
Bobsleigh two-man world championship medalists since 1931
Bobsleigh four-man world championship medalists since 1930

Italian male bobsledders
Possibly living people
Year of birth missing